Acanthophysium is a genus of fungi in the Stereaceae family. The widespread genus, which contains about 20 species, was circumscribed by New Zealand mycologist Gordon Herriot Cunningham in 1963.

Species
Acanthophysium apricans
Acanthophysium bertii
Acanthophysium bisporum
Acanthophysium buxicola
Acanthophysium tsugae

References

Russulales genera
Stereaceae
Fungi of New Zealand